South Front Street Historic District is a national historic district located in the Queen Village neighborhood of Philadelphia, Pennsylvania. It encompasses seven contributing buildings, including the Nathaniel Irish House, Widow Maloby's Tavern, and Capt. Thomas Moore House, which are individually listed on the NRHP.

It was added to the National Register of Historic Places in 1972.

References

External links

Historic American Buildings Survey in Philadelphia
Historic districts in Philadelphia
Houses on the National Register of Historic Places in Philadelphia
South Philadelphia
Historic districts on the National Register of Historic Places in Pennsylvania